The Neligh Mill is a water-powered flour mill in the city of Neligh in the northeastern part of the state of Nebraska in the Midwestern United States.  The mill was built in 1873 by John Neligh, the city's founder, to make use of water power from the Elkhorn River.  It operated for nearly one hundred years until it closed in 1969.

The Nebraska State Historical Society maintains the mill complex and describes it as the only 19th-century mill in the state that still possesses all of the original equipment used when it was in operation.  The mill is listed in the National Register of Historic Places.

History
John D. Neligh, founder of the Nebraska town of Neligh, began building the brick mill on the Elkhorn River in 1873. Another Neligh businessman, W. C. Gallaway, took over the mill and completed construction, including damming the Elkhorn River. A water turbine, which was positioned horizontally, powered the gear in the mill's basement. On August 29, 1874, the mill began operation, grinding wheat, corn, and buckwheat.

In 1886 the mill converted from stone mill burrs to modern steel rollers. It provided flour and meal for customers across Nebraska, as well as the War Department and Indian Bureau. Improvements in the mill's turbines allowed it to generate electrical power for the town, supplying it until 1925.

Current museum
The Neligh Mill is now run by the Nebraska Historical Society as a museum commemorating the importance of flour mills to Nebraska and the West as a whole. Exhibits relating to the operation of the mill and its history are located in the original warehouse from 1866, as well as the 1915 addition where the power plant was once housed. The Society has restored the mill's office building, which has original furnishings. It reconstructed the 1919 flume to the south.  The remnants of the dam that collected water for the mill are still visible on the Elkhorn River nearby.

Gallery

References

 Buecker, Thomas, Flour Milling in Nebraska (Educational Leaflet Number 17).
 Buecker, Thomas, Water Powered Flour Mills in Nebraska.
 Ireland, Lynne, ed., The Neligh Mills Cookbook.
 Josephson, Jeannie, "The Neligh Mill" in Andreas' History of the State of Nebraska: ANTELOPE COUNTY.
 Martin, Kent, Neligh Mill State Historic Site, A Self-Guided Tour

External links
 

Historic sites in Nebraska
Museums in Antelope County, Nebraska
State parks of Nebraska
Protected areas of Antelope County, Nebraska
1873 establishments in Nebraska
National Register of Historic Places in Antelope County, Nebraska
Grinding mills on the National Register of Historic Places in Nebraska
Industrial buildings completed in 1873
History Nebraska